The 2003 Pacific Curling Championships were held in Aomori, Japan November 23 to 29. 

New Zealand's Sean Becker won the men's event over Australia's Hugh Millikin. On the women's side, Japan's Shinobu Aota defeated South Korea's Kim Mi-yeon in the final.   

By virtue of winning, the New Zealand men's team and the Japanese women's team qualified for the 2004 World Men's and Women's Curling Championships in Gävle, Sweden.

Men's

Final round-robin standings

Playoffs

Women's

Final round-robin standings

Tiebreakers
 11-8 
 14-5

Playoffs

External links

Pacific Curling Championships, 2003
Pacific-Asia Curling Championships
International curling competitions hosted by Japan
2003 in Japanese sport
Sport in Aomori (city)
November 2003 sports events in Asia